Haemos is an alternative spelling of:
 King Haemus, in Greek mythology
 Haemus Mons (Mount Haemos) in the Balkans

It may also be the plural of haemo.